BB, Bb, or similar, may refer to:

In arts and entertainment

BB, abbreviation for a catalogue of works by Béla Bartók 
 BB (album), by Mod Sun (2017)
"BB Talk", 2015 song by Miley Cyrus
BB (Transformers), a character in the franchise
BB, pseudonym of author and artist Denys Watkins-Pitchford
Les B.B., a Canadian band from Quebec
BattleBots, a robot combat TV show 
Beast Boy, a comic book character
Beyond Birthday, a character from the novel Death Note Another Note: The Los Angeles BB Murder Cases
Big Brother (Nineteen Eighty-Four) or BB in Orwell's novel
Big Brother (TV series), home living reality TV popularity contest show
Billy Butcher, supporting character and final antagonist of The Boys comic book series
 Butcher, Baker, Candlestickmaker, spin-off comic miniseries of The Boys, following Billy Butcher
 "Butcher, Baker, Candlestick Maker" (The Boys), television adaptation of the comic miniseries
BB, the production code for the 1966 Doctor Who serial The War Machines
Balloon Boy, an animatronic character in Five Nights at Freddy's
BB-8, a robot in the Star Wars franchise
Breaking Bad
Bugs Bunny

Businesses and organisations 
BB 2000 Ltd, publisher of British Birds
BB Bloggingsbooks, an imprint of the German group VDM Publishing
BB Microlight, a Hungarian ultralight aircraft manufacturer
Balair (IATA airline code)
Banco do Brasil S.A., largest Brazilian and Latin American bank by assets
Bavarian Peasants' League or BB, a former German political party
BlackBerry Limited (stock ticker BB), Canadian technology company
Borderland Beat, an English-language news blog covering the Mexican Drug War 
Boys' Brigade, a Christian youth organization
Seaborne Airlines, IATA airline code

People 
Brigitte Bardot (born 1934), French actress
Benazir Bhutto (1953–2007), former Pakistani prime minister
Denys Watkins-Pitchford (1905–1990), British children's author's pseudonym

Places 
BB postcode area, Blackburn, England
Barbados (ISO and NATO 2-letter country code BB)
.bb, the top-level domain for Barbados
Bourbon County, Kansas (state county code)
Brandenburg, Germany (ISO 3166-2 code BB)

Science
Branch and bound, a general algorithm for finding optimal solutions
Busy beaver class in computing theory, a type of Turing Machine
Beta blocker, medication used to manage arrhythmias and to protect the heart from a second heart attack after a first heart attack

Transportation 
BB Microlight, a Hungarian ultralight aircraft manufacturer
Bürgenstock-Bahn, a funicular railway in the Swiss canton of Nidwalden
Toyota bB, a car sold in Japan
NZR Bb class, a New Zealand locomotive class
Balair (IATA airline code)
Seaborne Airlines (IATA airline code: BB)
Buckingham Branch Railroad (reporting mark BB)
Battleship, a U.S. Navy hull classification symbol
B (New York City Subway service), known as BB before 1967
B-B, a classification of AAR wheel arrangement of railway locomotives

Other uses 
BB (ammunition), ammunition for a BB gun
Base on balls in baseball, commonly known as a walk
BB cream, a type of cosmetic
Bed and breakfast or B&B, a style of accommodation
BBCode, a lightweight markup language used to format posts in many message boards

See also
B♭, B-flat (disambiguation)
B&B (disambiguation)
Bebe (disambiguation)
Bibi (disambiguation)